Odia grammar is the study of the morphological and syntactic structures, word order, case inflections, verb conjugation and other grammatical structures of Odia, an Indo-Aryan language spoken in South Asia.

Morphology
Morphology is the identification, analysis and description of the structure of morphemes and other units of meaning in the Odia language. Morphemes (called ରୁପିମ) are the smallest units of the Odia language that carry and convey a unique meaning and is grammatically appropriate. A morpheme in Odia is the most minuscule meaningful constituent which combines and synthesizes the phonemes into a meaningful expression through its (morpheme's) form & structure. Thus, in essence, the morpheme is a structural combination of phonemes in Odia. In other words, in the Odia language, the morpheme is a combination of sounds that possess and convey a meaning.  A morpheme is not necessarily a meaningful word in Odia. In Odia, every morpheme is either a base or an affix (prefix or a suffix).

Examples:
Base Morpheme:
 ଘର; 

Phonetic Components:
ଘରକୁ = ଘ୍ + ଅ + ର୍ + ଅ + କ୍ + ଉ

Morphological Components:
ଘରକୁ = ଘର + କୁ 

 ହାତ; 

Morphological Components/Derivatives:

ହାତୀ  = ହାତ + ଈ  (ଈ = ଅଛି)
ହାତିଆ = ହାତ + ଇଆ (ଇଆ = ପରିମାଣ)
ହାତୁଡ଼ି = ହାତ + ଉଡ଼ି (ଉଡି = ଆକୃତି)

General analysis
The existence and span of rules of morphemes in a language depend on the "morphology" in that particular language. In a language having greater morphology, a word would have an internal compositional structure in terms of word-pieces (i.e. free morphemes – Bases) and those would also possess bound morphemes like affixes. Such a morpheme-rich language is termed as synthetic language. To the contrary, an isolating language uses independent words and in turn, the words lack internal structure. A synthetic language tends to employ affixes and internal modification of roots (i.e. free morphemes – Bases) for the same purpose of expressing additional meanings.

Odia is a moderately synthetic language. It contains definite synthetic features, such as the bound morphemes mark tense, number (plurality), gender etc. However, though the Odia language has a larger number of derivational affixes, it has virtually no inflectional morphology.

Derivational synthesis in Odia morphology
Odia morphemes of different types (nouns, verbs, affixes, etc.) combine to create new words.

Relational synthesis in Odia morphology
In relationally synthesized Odia words, base morphemes (root words) join with bound morphemes to express grammatical function.

The Odia language has a tendency for commonly used words to have a 2:1 morpheme-word ratio i.e. on an average; there are 2 morphemes in a single word. Because of this tendency, Odia is said to "possess morphology" since almost each used word has an internal compositional structure in terms morphemes. In the Odia language, generally, separate words are used to express syntactic relationships which imparts an isolating  tendency, while using inflectional morphology could have made the language more synthetic.

Components of a morpheme
There are several components of a morpheme in the Odia language. There are as follows:

Base: A morpheme that imparts meaning on a word.

Derivational Morpheme: These morphemes alter and/or modify the meaning of the word and may create a whole new word.

Allomorphs: These are different phonetic forms or variations of a morpheme. The final morphemes in several words are pronounced differently, but they all signify plurality.

Homonyms: are morphemes that are spelled the similarly but have different meanings. Such examples abound Odia grammar and are termed as similarly pronounced words (ସମୋଚ୍ଚାରିତ ଶବ୍ଦ).  Examples: 

ଜୀବନ (life) and ଜୀବନ (water), ହରି (Lord Vishnu) and ହରି (Monkey).

Homophones: These are morphemes that sound alike but have different meanings and spellings.  Examples:
ସିତ (Black colour),  ସୀତ (Plough head).

Classification
Morphemes in Odia may be classified, on the basis of word formation, characteristics into the following types:

Types of morphemes

Free morpheme
Independent meaningful units are free morphemes. These are elemental words. Free morpheme can stand alone as a word without help of another morpheme.  It does not need anything attached to it to make a word.

ରାମ ଭାତ ଖାଉଛି = ରାମ ଭାତ(କୁ) ଖାଉଛି: କର୍ମ
ରାତି ବିତାଇଲା = ରାତି(ରେ) ବିତାଇଲା: ଅଧିକରଣ
ରାମ କଥା ଶୁଣିଲି = ରାମ(ର) କଥା ଶୁଣିଲି: ସମ୍ବନ୍ଧ ପଦ

Bound morpheme
Units which are not independent words but convey meaning on account of their usage on combination are bound morphemes. A bound morpheme is a sound or a combination of sounds that cannot stand on its own as a meaningful word. Most of the bound morphemes in Odia are ‘affixes’. An affix is a morpheme that may come at the beginning (Termed as Prefix) or the end (Termed as Suffix) of a base morpheme.

In Odia, prefixes are bound morphemes are affixes that come before a base morpheme. For example:

ଉପକୂଳ = ଉପ + କୂଳ
ଉପନଦୀ = ଉପ + ନଦୀ
ଅପବାଦ = ଅପ + ବାଦ
ଅପରୂପ = ଅପ + ରୂପ

A suffix is an affix that comes after a base morpheme. Example of suffix Bound Morphemes are:

ସାଧୁତା = ସାଧୁ + ତା
ବୀରତ୍ୱ = ବୀର + ତ୍ୱ
କାମିକା = କାମ + ଇକା
ନିସୃୃତ  = ନିଃ + କୃତ
ତା, ତ୍ୱ, ଇକା are bound morphemes used suffixes.
/ସାଧୁ/, /ବୀର/, /କାମ/ etc. are ‘complete bound morphemes’ /ତା/, /ତ୍ୱ/, /ଇକା/ etc. are ‘dissected or partial bound morphemes’.

The free morphemes carry a fixed meaning while the bound morphemes exhibit large scale variations in meanings. The variable and changing meanings of the bound morphemes impart diversity to word meanings and enrich the language.

Complex or combined morpheme
In a complex morpheme, multiple free morphemes are combined to form a word and impart meaning. More than one Stem Morphemes create a complex morpheme.

Noun + Noun:
ଘରଭଡ଼ା = ଘର + ଭଡ଼ା 
ରଙ୍ଗମଞ୍ଚ = ରଙ୍ଗ + ମଞ୍ଚ

Adjective + Noun:
କଳା + ପଟା = କଳାପଟା

Noun + Adjective:
ସର୍ବ + ସାଧାରଣ = ସର୍ବସାଧାରଣ

Adjective + Adjective: 
ଭୀମ + କାନ୍ତ = ଭୀମକାନ୍ତ

Mixed morpheme
Where both free and bound morphemes combine to form another morpheme, the result is called a mixed morpheme. The mixed morpheme may result from the following combinations:

ମଣିଷ + ପଣ + ଇଆ = ମଣିଷପଣ + ଇଆ = ମଣିଷପଣିଆ

ମଣିଷପଣ is a complex morpheme while ଇଆ is a bound morpheme.

Inflectional morphemes can only be suffixes. An inflectional morpheme creates a change in the function of the word. Example, ଇଲା with  ସୁଗନ୍ଧ, giving rise to ସୁଗନ୍ଧିଲା, indicates past tense. Odia has innumerable inflectional morphemes, unlike only seven in English Language. Among others, these include the following:

 ମାନେ, ଗୁଡ଼ା, ଗୁଡ଼ିଏ (plural, -s in English language)
 ର, ଙ୍କର, ମାନଙ୍କ, ମାନଙ୍କର;  -'s (possessive) are noun inflections;
 ଇଲା, ନିର୍ମିତିଲା past tense (-ed),

 ଉଛି; -ing (present participle) are verb inflections;

In Odia morphology, there are no adjective and adverb inflections like the comparative (-er) and superlative (-est) of English language. Instead, bound morphemes like ଠାରୁ and ରୁ, and free morphemes like ତୁଳନାରେ etc. are used.

Marker morpheme
In linguistics, a marker is a morpheme, mostly bound, that indicates the grammatical function of the target (marked) word or sentence. In a language like Odia with isolating language tendencies, it is possible to express syntactic information via separate grammatical words instead via morphology (with bound morphemes). Therefore, the marker morphemes are easily distinguished.

Verb morpheme
Verb roots can take transformation and function as morphemes.

ଖା + ଇଆ = ଖିଆ = ମଣିଷଖିଆ ବାଘ
ପ୍ରଭାବ + ଇଆ = ପ୍ରଭାବିଆ = ପ୍ରଭାବିଆ ମଣିଷ
Verb Morpheme can be either continuous morphemes or perfect morphemes on the basis of tense.

Verb continuous morphemes:
ଖା + ଇ = ଖାଇ
ଅନୁବାଦ + ଇ = ଅନୁବାଦି

Verb perfect morphemes:
ଖା + ଇଲା = ଖାଇଲା
ଅନୁଭାବ + ଇଲା = ଅନୁଭାବିଲା

Sub-morpheme
Sub-morphemes are metamorphosis of actual morphemes. Sub-morphemes are also called complementary morphemes or meta-morphemes. Sub-morphemes may arise on account of changes in number of noun morphemes or tense of verb morphemes or gender of noun morphemes, as under:

 Number:
/ଗୋଟିଏ/ + /ଘର/ = /ଗୋଟିଏ ଘର/ One + House = A House

/ଗୁଡ଼ିଏ/ + /ଘର/ = / ଗୁଡ଼ିଏ ଘର/ Many + House = Many Houses

/ଗୋଟିଏ/ + /ଲୋକ/ = /ଲୋକଟିଏ /
/ଅନେକ/ + /ଲୋକ/ = /ଲୋକ/ Sub Morpheme: /ଏ /

 Tense:
The sub-morphemes are different appearances of a morpheme at different tense. For instance, the present perfect morpheme in Odia is: /ଇଲା/
However, the present perfect sub-morpheme of /ଇଲା/ is /ଲା/. For instance:
/ଖା/ + /ଇଲା/ = /ଖାଇଲା/
/ପା/ + /ଇଲା/ = /ପାଇଲା/
are normal usage of /ଇଲା/.
However, the sub-morpheme is:
/ଗ/ + /ଲା/ = /ଗଲା/
/ଦେ/ + /ଲା/ = /ଦେଲା/
/ନେ/ + /ଲା/ = /ନେଲା/

Difference between morphemes, words and syllables in Odia

Even though morphemes combine to create a word in Odia, the morphemes are not always independent words. Some single morphemes are words while other words are composed of two or more morphemes.

In Odia, morphemes are also different from syllables. Many words have two or more syllables but only one morpheme. For example: ମୋ'ର.On the other hand, many words have two morphemes and only one syllable; examples include ଧନୀ, ମୋଟା.

Nouns
Nouns are those which are inflected by number, gender or case markers.

Number
There are two types of numbers in Odia:
 singular- ଏକବଚନ 
 plural- ବହୁବଚନ 
Singular denotes one and only one person or thing and the noun maybe followed or preceded by singular specifiers or singular number markers. Plural which denotes number more than one person or thing, is formed by the addition of plural suffixes to the nouns which usually occur as singular.

The singular number markers occur as suffix:

The plural number occur with nominal forms as:

Gender
There is no grammatical gender in Odia, instead gender is lexical. Though gender plays no major role in grammatical agreement between subject and predicate but it is accounted for in nominal inflections. There are three types of gender:
 masculine- ପୁଲିଙ୍ଗ 
 feminine- ସ୍ତ୍ରୀଲିଙ୍ଗ 
 common- ଉଭୟଲିଙ୍ଗ 
 neuter- କ୍ଲୀବଲିଙ୍ଗ

Case
Case inflection is a common characteristic of inflectional languages and are also known as case markers or "ବିଭକ୍ତି" in Odia. It is both syntactical and morphological in nature. The function of the case is to indicate the grammatical or semantic relationships between nouns and also between nouns and verbs in a larger syntactic structure.
There are 8 types of cases in Odia:

For Vocative case: Due to lack of synthetic inflectional morphemes, a vocative particle is used.

Pronouns
Pronouns are classified both notionally and morphologically.

Personal pronouns are of two types:
Direct case- used for Nominative case
Oblique case- used with case inflections (Accusative, Instrumental, Dative, Ablative, Genitive, Locative)

Adjectives

Postpositions
Postpositions used with Inflections: The postpositions which occur with nominal forms and function as both morphological and syntactic markers. They are added to the nominal stems formed by noun-genitive case markers.
 

Indeclinable Postpositions: Those which do not have inflected suffixes, function as indeclinables.

Classifiers
When a noun is enumerated, it takes a group of morphemes called classifiers.

When the number denotes 'one', then the structure of the phrase:
 classifier-numeral noun
Eg- ଜଣେ ପିଲା – one child

When the numeral is more than 'one', then the structure is:
 numeral classifier noun
Eg- ଦୁଇ ଜଣ ପିଲା – two children

Classifiers have two types-
 qualifiers- used for count nouns.

Nouns which occur with ଗୋଟା,ଗୋଟି or its variant -ଟା,-ଟି

Eg- ଗୋଟିଏ ପିଲା – one child, ଦୁଇଟି ପିଲା -two children
ଗୋଟିଏ ଘର – one house, ଦୁଇଟି ଘର – two houses

Other types of count nouns of human and non human forms include-
 ଜଣେ ପିଲା – one child
 ଖଣ୍ଡେ ଲୁଗା – one piece of cloth
 ଗୋଛାଏ କାଠ – one bundle of wood
 ଫାଳେ କାଠ – a half piece of wood
 ଗଦାଏ କାଠ – one heap of wood
 କିଲେ କାଠ – one kilo of wood
 ଫୁଟେ କାଠ – one foot of wood
 ବସ୍ତାଏ କାଠ – one sack of wood

 quantifiers- used for mass nouns

Nouns which occur with ମେଞ୍ଚା

Eg- ମେଞ୍ଚାଏ କାଦୁଅ – a lump of mud

See also
Odia language
Odia script
Odia literature

References

Bibliography
 

John Beames, A comparative grammar of the modern Aryan languages of India: to wit, Hindi, Panjabi, Sindhi, Gujarati, Marathi, Oriya, and Bangali. Londinii: Trübner, 1872–1879. 3 vols.

Further reading
 Fromkin, Victoria, and Robert Rodman, An Introduction to Language,  5th ed., Fort Worth: Harcourt Brace Joanovich College Publishers, 1993
 Bauer, Mary Beth, et al., Grammar and Composition, New Jersey: Prentice-Hall Inc., 1982
 Dhal, Golok Behari, Introduction to Oriya Phonetics, 1961
 Ghosh, A, An ethnolinguistic profile of Eastern India: a case of South Orissa, Burdwan: Dept. of Bengali (D.S.A.), University of Burdwan, 2003
 Masica, Colin (1991). The Indo-Aryan Languages,  Cambridge Language Surveys. Cambridge: Cambridge University Press. 
 Mohanty, Prasanna Kumar (2007). The History of Oriya Literature (Oriya Sahityara Adya Aitihasika Gana).

Odia language
Indo-Aryan grammars